The Green Ecologist Party was the name of an electoral alliance set up for the 2008 Romanian legislative election. The alliance consisted of two green parties: the Green Party and the Ecologist Party of Romania. It did not win any seats in Parliament, gaining only 0.27% of the vote for the Chamber of Deputies and 0.70% respectively for the Senate.

Electoral history

Legislative elections

External links

Defunct political party alliances in Romania